Kasegar Mahalleh or Kas Gar Mahalleh may refer to:
 Kasegar Mahalleh, Babolsar
 Kasegar Mahalleh, Nur

See also
 Kaseh Gar Mahalleh